The 2022–23 OHL season is the 43rd season of operation (42nd season of play) of the Ontario Hockey League. The league will play a 68-game regular season which began on September 29, 2022 and will conclude on March 26, 2023. The post-season is scheduled to begin on March 29, 2023.

The team who wins the J. Ross Robertson Cup will represent the Ontario Hockey League at the 2023 Memorial Cup, which will be hosted by the Kamloops Blazers of the Western Hockey League. Games will be played at the Sandman Centre in Kamloops, British Columbia.

Preseason
On July 12, 2022, the OHL announced the preseason schedule for the 2022–23 season. In total, there will be 51 preseason games beginning on September 2 and concluding on September 25. All OHL teams will play between three and six preseason games.

On September 10, the Ottawa 67's played the Gatineau Olympiques of the QMJHL at Centre Slush Puppie in Gatineau, Quebec in the only interleague preseason game. The Olympiques defeated the 67's by a score of 6-1 in front of 2,688 fans.

Neutral site games will be played in Ancaster, Ayr, Clarington, Clinton, Cobourg, Cornwall, Kanata, Midland, Millbrook, Norwood, Pembroke, Port Colborne, Virgil, and Whitby.

OHL training camps began in late August in preparation of the 2022-23 season, which began on September 29, 2022.

Regular season

Relocation
On February 7, 2023, the Hamilton Bulldogs announced that the club would be moving to Brantford, Ontario for three seasons due to renovations and the long-term closure of First Ontario Centre beginning in the 2023–24 season. The team also announced that the team would be known as the Brantford Bulldogs and play at the Brantford Civic Centre.

Standings
as of March 19, 2023

Note: DIV = Division; GP = Games played; W = Wins; L = Losses; OTL = Overtime losses; SL = Shootout losses; GF = Goals for; GA = Goals against;  PTS = Points; x = clinched playoff berth; y = clinched division title; z = clinched conference title

Eastern conference

Western conference

Scoring leaders
Note: GP = Games played; G = Goals; A = Assists; Pts = Points; PIM = Penalty minutes

Leading goaltenders
Note: GP = Games played; Mins = Minutes played; W = Wins; L = Losses: OTL = Overtime losses;  SL = Shootout losses; GA = Goals Allowed; SO = Shutouts; GAA = Goals against average

Playoffs

Conference quarterfinals

Eastern conference quarterfinals

(1) Ottawa 67's vs. (8) TBD

Western conference quarterfinals

(4) Saginaw Spirit vs. (5) TBD

Awards

2023 IIHF World Junior Championship
The 2023 IIHF World Junior Championship was held at Scotiabank Centre in Halifax, Nova Scotia and at Avenir Centre in Moncton, New Brunswick which began on December 26, 2022 ended on January 5, 2023.

Eighteen current and former OHL players were on eight rosters in this tournament, including six on Canada, three on Switzerland, two on Czechia, Slovakia and the United States, and one on Austria, Germany and Latvia.

Austria
Team Austria had one OHL player on their roster, as Vinzenz Rohrer of the Ottawa 67's was named to the team.

In five games, Rohrer finished in third in team scoring, as he recorded a goal and two assists for three points.

Austria finished the preliminary round of the tournament in last place in Group A with a 0-0-0-4 record. In the best-of-three relegation round, Austria lost to Latvia in two games to finish in tenth place in the tournament.

Canada
The Canadian team had six current and former OHL players on their original roster. The players on the Canadian team who currently played in the OHL are: Ethan Del Mastro, Mississauga Steelheads; Ben Gaudreau, Sarnia Sting; Jack Matier, Ottawa 67's and Brennan Othmann, Peterborough Petes. Two former OHL players were also on the team: former Barrie Colts player Brandt Clarke, who played on the Los Angeles Kings and former Kingston Frontenacs player Shane Wright of the Seattle Kraken. Wright was named captain of the team. Later in the tournament, Canada added Owen Beck from the Mississauga Steelheads as an injury replacement.

In seven games, Clarke led the Canadian defense with two goals and eight points. Wright scored four goals and seven points in seven games. Othmann scored two goals and six points in seven games, while Del Mastro earned three assists in seven games. Beck earned an assist in three games and Matier had an assist in seven games. Gaudreau earned a record of 1-1-0 in two games with a 3.38 GAA and a 0.828 save percentage.

Canada finished second in Group A during the preliminary round with a record of 3-0-0-1, earning nine points. In the quarter-finals, Canada defeated Slovakia 4-3 in overtime. In the semi-finals, the Canadians defeated the United States 6-2, advancing to the championship game. In the Gold Medal game, Canada defeated Czechia 3-2 in overtime to win the tournament.

Czechia
Team Czechia had two OHL players on their roster. The players named to the team were Tomas Hamara of the Kitchener Rangers and Matyas Sapovaliv of the Saginaw Spirit.

Sapovaliv earned seven assists in seven games to finish tied for fifth in team scoring. Hamara earned an assist in seven games.

Czechia finished in first place in Group A during the preliminary round, earning a record of 3-0-1-0 for ten points. In the quarter-finals, Czechia defeated Switzerland 9-1 to advance to the semi-finals. In the semi-final game, Czechia defeated Sweden 2-1 to earn a berth in the Gold Medal game. In the final game of the tournament, Czechia lost to Canada 3-2 in overtime to win the silver medal.

Germany
Team Germany had one OHL player on their roster. Ryan Del Monte of the London Knights was the lone OHL player that made the team.

Del Monte was held to no points in two games during the tournament.

Germany finished in fourth place in Group A during the preliminary round with a 1-0-0-3 record, earning three points. In the quarter-finals, Germany lost to the United States 11-1 to be eliminated from the tournament. Germany finished in eighth place in the tournament.

Latvia
Latvia had one OHL player on their roster. Sandis Vilmanis of the Sarnia Sting was named to the team.

Vilmanis scored a goal and added an assist for two points in six games.

Latvia finished the prelimiary round of the tournament in last place in Group B with a record of 0-0-1-3, earning one point. In the best-of-three relegation series against Austria, Latvia swept the series in two games. Latvia finished the tournament in ninth place.

Slovakia
Team Slovakia had two OHL players on their roster, as Filip Mesar of the Kitchener Rangers and Servac Petrovsky of the Owen Sound Attack were named to the team.

Mesar finished tied for the team lead in points, as he recorded two goals and four assists for six points in five games. Petrovsky scored two goals and three points in five games to finish tied for fifth in team scoring.

Slovakia finished the preliminary round of the tournament with a 2-0-1-1 record, finishing in third place with seven points. In the quarter-finals, Slovakia lost to Canada 4-3 in overtime. Slovakia finished the tournament in sixth place.

Switzerland
Team Switzerland named three OHL players to their team. Alessio Beglieri of the Mississauga Steelheads, Rodwin Dionicio of the Niagara IceDogs and Brian Zanetti of the Peterborough Petes  represented their country at the tournament.

In five games, Dionico scored a goal, while Zanetti earned an assist in five games. Beglieri earned a record of 0-2-0 with a 6.07 GAA and a 0.831 save percentage in two games.

Switzerland had a record of 0-3-0-1 in four games during the preliminary round, earning six points and fourth place in Group B. In the quarter-finals, Switzerland lost to Czechia 9-1. Switzerland finished the tournament in seventh place.

United States
The United States had two players of the OHL on their roster. The players were Tyler Boucher of the Ottawa 67's and Andrew Oke of the Peterborough Petes.

Boucher finished the tournament with three goals and four points in six games. Oke earned a record of 1-0-0 with a 3.00 GAA and a 0.875 save percentage in one game.

The United States finished in first place in Group B with a 3-0-0-1 record, earning nine points, during the preliminary round. In the quarter-finals, the United States defeated Germany 9-1 to advance to the semi-finals. In the semi-final game, the United States lost to Canada 6-2 to advance to the Bronze Medal game. The United States captured the bronze medal with a 8-7 overtime win over Sweden.

References

External links
 www.ontariohockeyleague.com

Ontario Hockey League seasons
OHL